This article is about the demographic features of the population of French Polynesia, including population density, ethnicity, education level, health of the populace, economic status, religious affiliations and other aspects of the population.

Births and deaths

CIA World Factbook demographic statistics 
The following demographic statistics are from the CIA World Factbook, unless otherwise indicated.

Age structure
0–14 years: 21.69% (male 32,920/female 31,100)
15–24 years: 14.72% (male 22,640/female 20,793)
25–54 years: 44.24% (male 66,921/female 63,636)
55–64 years: 10.31% (male 15,610/female 14,823)
65 years and over: 9.04% (male 12,854/female 13,824) (2020 est.)

Population growth rate
0.73%

Birth rate
13.47 births/1,000 population

Death rate
5.59 deaths/1,000 population

Net migration rate
-0.63 migrant(s)/1,000 population

Sex ratio
At birth: 1.05 male(s)/female
0–14 years: 1.06 male(s)/female
15–24 years: 1.09 male(s)/female
25–54 years: 1.05 male(s)/female
55–64 years: 1.05 male(s)/female
65 years and over: 0.79 male(s)/female
total population: 1.05 male(s)/female

Infant mortality rate
Total: 4.4 deaths/1,000 live births
Male: 5.3 deaths/1,000 live births
Female: 3.46 deaths/1,000 live births (2022 est.)

Life expectancy at birth
Total population: 78.43 years
Male: 76.11 years
Female: 80.86 years (2022 est.)

Total fertility rate
1.81 children born/woman

Nationality
noun: French Polynesian(s)
adjective: French Polynesian

Ethnic groups
Polynesian 78%
Chinese 12%
local French 6%
metropolitan French 4%

Religions
Protestant 54%
Roman Catholic 30%
Other 10%
No religion 6%

Languages

French (official) 73,5%
Tahitian (official) 20,1%
Marquesan 2,6%
Austral languages 1,2%
Paumotu 1%
other 1,6%

See also
French Polynesia
Europeans in Oceania

References

 
Society of French Polynesia